This is a complete list of all the singles that entered the VG-lista (the official Norwegian hit-chart) in 1960. Altogether, 46 singles entered the VG-lista in 1960, and they are all listed below according to how well they have charted over time.

Detailed listing of Number-One hits in 1960

Top singles of 1960

External links 
 VG-Lista - the official Norwegian hit-chart
 VG-lista - Top 100 singles of all time in Norway

Norwegian record charts
Norwegian music
Norwegian music-related lists
1960 in Norwegian music